Chunghua University may refer to:

 Chung Hua University, a university in Taiwan
 Wuchang Chunghua University, a defunct university in China